This is a list of television series and films based on Harvey Comics publications. It includes live-action and animated films, theatrical releases, direct-to-video releases, and television film releases.

Television

Live-action

Animated series

Film

Theatrical films

Direct-to-video and TV films

Reception

Box office

Critical and public reception

See also 
Harvey Films
Casper the Friendly Ghost in film
List of television series based on Marvel Comics publications
List of films based on Marvel Comics publications
List of unproduced Marvel Comics projects
List of unproduced television projects based on Marvel Comics
List of television series based on DC Comics publications
List of films based on DC Comics publications
List of unproduced DC Comics projects
List of television series and films based on Dark Horse Comics publications
List of unproduced Dark Horse projects
List of television series and films based on Image Comics publications
List of unproduced Image Comics projects
List of television series and films based on Archie Comics publications
List of television programs based on comics
List of films based on comics
List of comic-based films directed by women
List of comic-based television episodes directed by women

References 

 
Harvey Comics
 
Harvey Comics